Senator Licht may refer to:

Frank Licht (1916–1987), Rhode Island State Senate
Richard A. Licht (born 1948), Rhode Island State Senate